Mahlab Cabinet may refer to
 First Mahlab Cabinet, active from March–June 2014.
 Second Mahlab Cabinet, active from June 2014-March 2015.
 Third Mahlab Cabinet,  active from March-September 2015.

See also
 Ibrahim Mahlab